The Critérium International was a two-day bicycle stage race held in France every spring from 1932 until 2016, typically the last weekend of March. It was formerly known as the Critérium National de la Route, first run in 1932. For many years it was considered a sort of French national championship and was finally opened to non–French cyclists in 1979. Bernard Hinault is the only cyclist to win the race in both its forms. The race has been won by some of the most famous names in cycling, including Jacques Anquetil, Sean Kelly, Bernard Hinault, Miguel Induráin, Stephen Roche, Joop Zoetemelk, Laurent Fignon, Jens Voigt, Cadel Evans and Chris Froome.

History and route
The Critérium International is one of the few races in cycling, apart from the three Grand Tours, with no fixed attachment to a region. Upon its creation in 1932, it was held as a one-day race in the Vallée de Chevreuse, finishing in the Parc des Princes velodrome in Paris. From 1941 to 1943, two races were organized each year: one in Nazi-occupied France and one in the free French State. As of 1959 the race location changed every year. The edition of 1960 took place in Oran in French Algeria. From 1963 to 1966 the Critérium was held as a stage race for the first time, and again ever since 1978.

From 2001 to 2009 the race was organized in the Ardennes with all stages starting and finishing in or around Charleville-Mézières. In 2010 the race moved to the island of Corsica, around the coastal city of Porto-Vecchio. In 2014 the ASO agreed a deal to extend the race's stay until at least 2016. Because of its challenging route and usually mild weather conditions in early spring, the Critérium International is often contended by many general classification riders in their build-up towards the Grand Tours, notably the Tour de France.

November 18, 2016 the ASO announced that it will no longer organise the two-day event and race will not be held in 2017, ending 85-year run.

1997 horse incident
In 1997, a horse jumped over a fence and joined the peloton, eventually passing it, leaving the race only 20 km from the finish line. This scene was shown briefly in the movie Amélie, and is often mistaken for a scene from a Tour de France race.

Winners

*Results later voided for doping infringements

Multiple winners 
Riders in italic are still active.

Wins per country

References

External links

 
Recurring sporting events established in 1932
1932 establishments in France
Cycle races in France
UCI Europe Tour races
Sport in Corsica
Recurring sporting events disestablished in 2016
Defunct cycling races in France